Andrejus Olijnikas (born 16 October 1987) is a Lithuanian canoeist.

In 2015 he and Ričardas Nekriošius finished at 7th place in World Championships and qualified for the 2016 Summer Olympics.

At the 2022 ICF Canoe Sprint World Championships Olijnikas together with Mindaugas Maldonis won silver medal in K-2 500 m event.

References

External links

Lithuanian male canoeists
1987 births
Living people
Canoeists at the 2015 European Games
European Games competitors for Lithuania
Place of birth missing (living people)
Canoeists at the 2016 Summer Olympics
Olympic canoeists of Lithuania
ICF Canoe Sprint World Championships medalists in kayak
Canoeists at the 2019 European Games